Suizhong County is a county of southwestern Liaoning, People's Republic of China. It is located on the northern coast of the Bohai Sea and is the southernmost county of Huludao City (as well as non-peninsular Liaoning), bordering Hebei to the southwest. Suizhong is the home of the first Chinese citizen to travel in space, Yang Liwei.

Administrative divisions
There are 14 towns, five townships, and six ethnic townships in the county.

Climate
Suizhong County has a monsoon-influenced humid continental climate (Köppen Dwa), with cold, very dry, and rather long winters, and hot, humid summers; a majority of the annual rainfall occurs in July and August alone. Due to the coastal location, temperatures are moderated in the summer, but prevailingly northerly and westerly winds minimise maritime influence during winter.

References

County-level divisions of Liaoning
Huludao